The Franklin Athletic Club was an early professional football team based in Franklin, Pennsylvania. It was considered the top team in professional football in 1903, by becoming the US Football Champions and winning the 1903 World Series of Football, held after the 1903 season, at New York's Madison Square Garden. The team was also the rivals to the nearby Oil City Athletic Club.

1902 bidding war
Franklin and Oil City, Pennsylvania had a lot of money tied up in their football teams. In 1902, during the teams' third meeting however, Oil City signed the entire team from the Pittsburgh Athletic Club, seven of the Philadelphia All-Stars, some players from a team located in Steubenville, Ohio and from Grove City College for that one game against Franklin. Since there was a large amount of hometown gambling on football games in 1902, this action resulted in all of the Franklin fans losing their bets to Oil City. However while losing the game, Franklin did manage to hold Oil City's all star team to a 10-0 score.

1903 Pre-season
To avoid being out bid again by Oil City for football talent, Franklin's manager Bill Prince recruited an every star player inside of Pennsylvania to play for Franklin. After the team's loss against Oil City, Prince attended the first National Football League championship game between the Pittsburgh Stars and Philadelphia Athletics. Immediately after the game, Prince signed every important player in sight to Franklin.

After seeing what Prince had done, Oil City forfeited their season due to a lack of players. All of the money that was to be gambled on the 1903 football contests between Franklin and Oil City, sat in a bank escrow account and was later returned to the gamblers.

1903 season

With every major football star under contract with Franklin, Prince decided to open up a challenge to every major professional football club in Pennsylvania. Many stars from the first NFL played for Franklin including Blondy Wallace and Eddie Wood who later became one of the first players to catch forward passes when they became legal in 1906. The team marched its way to a 10-0 record. Franklin then defeated the Pittsburgh Athletic Club, which consisted of the ringers that defeated them the year before, 23-0.

1903 World Series of Football
After defeating the Syracuse Athletic Club, the winners of the 1902 World Series of Football, 12-0. Franklin entered the 1903 Series to be held at Madison Square Garden. The walked away with the Series Championship after defeating the Watertown Red & Black 12-0. However, after winning the Championship, Prince announced that Franklin would not field an all-star squad in 1904.

References

American football teams established in 1890
American football teams disestablished in 1903
History of Pennsylvania
Defunct American football teams in Pennsylvania
Early professional American football teams in Pennsylvania
World Series of Football (1902–03)
 Athletic Club football teams and seasons